Peridrome orbicularis is a species of moth in the  family Erebidae. The species is found in Bangladesh (Silhet), Cambodia, India (Andaman Islands, Assam and Meghalaya), Indonesia (Java, Sumatra, Sumbawa, Sulawesi, Borneo), Laos, Malaysia (Pinang), Myanmar, the Philippines (Luzon, Palawan, Mindanao and Mindoro), Thailand and Vietnam.

The wingspan is about 67 mm for males and 71 mm for females.

The larvae have been recorded on Apocynaceae species.

External links
 Species info at www.aganainae.nl
 The Moths of Borneo

Aganainae
Moths of Asia
Moths described in 1854